Fudge is a brand of chocolate bar manufactured by Cadbury. It is a bar of fudge in a semi-circular cross-section covered in a layer of milk chocolate. Produced in small bite size bars and in larger bars, the Fudge continues to be produced and sold in countries such as the United Kingdom and Ireland. It was launched in 1948, originally under the name Milk Fudge which later became simply Fudge.

Production

In November/December 2010, production of Fudge was transferred to Cadbury's new plant in Skarbimierz, Poland from the Keynsham Cadbury's plant in Somerset. Labels for these products do not state a country of origin, instead stating "Made in the EU under licence from Cadbury UK Ltd".

See also
 List of chocolate bar brands

References

British confectionery
Cadbury brands
Chocolate bars
Mondelez International brands